Pā'ula'ula State Historical Park (Russian Fort Elizabeth) is a National Historic Landmark and is administered as the Pā'ula'ula State Historical Park just southeast of present-day Waimea on the island of Kauai in Hawaii. It is located at the site of the former Fort Elizavety, the last remaining Russian fort on the Hawaiian islands, built in the early 19th century by the Russian-American Company as the result of an alliance with High Chief Kaumualii. The star fort was employed by the Kingdom of Hawaii in the 19th century under the name Fort Hipo.

History

In 1815, German physician Georg Anton Schäffer, an agent of the Russian-American Company, arrived in Hawaii to retrieve goods seized by Kaumualii, chief of Kauai island. According to the company instructions, Schäffer had to begin by establishing friendly relations with king Kamehameha I who had created a kingdom incorporating all the islands of Hawaii and faced opposition from rebellious Kaumuali'i. Then, with or without Kamehameha's support, Schäffer had to recover the cost of lost merchandise from Kaumualii.

Schäffer's medical expertise gained Kamehameha's respect but he denied the Russians any assistance against Kaumualii. Schäffer was followed by two company ships, the Otkrytie and the Il’mena. He then sailed to Kauai on his own. To his surprise, Kaumualii eagerly signed a "treaty" granting Russian Tsar Alexander I of Russia a protectorate over Kauai. Kaumualii convinced Schäffer that the Russians could just as easily capture the whole archipelago. Schäffer promised that Tsar Alexander would help him to break free of Kamehameha's rule. Officially, Kaumualii had pledged allegiance to Kamehameha in 1810. Kaumualii probably never intended to give up power over the island; he thought he might reclaim his own kingdom with the help of Russia. Kaumualii allowed Schäffer to build a fort near Waimea, named Fort or Fortress Elizabeth (Elizavetinskaya Krepost’) in honor of the Empress of Russia at the time, Louise of Baden. Two others  Fortress Alexander (Krepost’ Aleksandra) and Fort Barclay-de-Tolly (Fort Barklaya-de-Tolli)  were named for the reigning emperor Alexander and his marshal Michael Andreas Barclay de Tolly and constructed near Hanalei on Kauai.
Fort Elizabeth was constructed in 1817 on the east bank of the Waimea River overlooking Waimea Bay. It housed a small Russian Orthodox chapel, Hawaii's first Orthodox Christian church. Fort Alexander built on Hanalei Bay also housed a small Orthodox chapel. When it was discovered that Schäffer did not have the backing of the Tsar, he was forced to leave Kauai in the fall of 1817. Captain Alexander Adams replaced the Russian flag with the new Kingdom of Hawaii flag some time before October 1817. Russian Fort Elizabeth eventually came under the control of Kamehameha supporters.

In 1820, the guns fired in salute as  Kaumualii's son, Prince George "Prince" Kaumualii (also known as Humehume) arrived on the ship Thaddeus, after guiding American missionaries back to his home. Humehume tried to stage a rebellion in 1824 by attacking the fort. It was used as a base to capture him and keep the kingdom unified. It was abandoned in 1853.

Dismantling
The Kingdom of Hawaii tasked Kauai pioneer Valdemar Knudsen with the removal of armaments from the fort.  Similar work was being done in that era across the kingdom with other forts being dismantled at Kailua-Kona, Lāhainā and along the waterfront at the old port of Honolulu.  In a letter sent to Honolulu, Knudsen listed an inventory of the guns at the fort following a survey made in 1862. They included 60 flintlock muskets, 16 swords, 12 18-pound cannon, 26 4- and 6-pound cannon, 6 heavy guns and 24 little guns. During the decommissioning of the fort in 1864, while Knudsen was loading armaments and munitions for sale as scrap metal onto a schooner in Waimea Bay, one or two cannons fell into the murky waters of Waimea Bay.

Access
The fort is located at coordinates , on the southeastern shore of the mouth of the Waimea River in Waimea, Kauai County, Hawaii. A small parking lot is south of the Hawaii Route 50 bridge, known as Kaumualii Highway in honor of the last king. Facilities at the park include an interpretive walking path, and restrooms. A brochure with details of the site is available for a self-guided interpretive tour. Visitors to this site can enjoy exploring the remains of the fort, viewing scenery, photography and historical interpretation.

Significance 
This large stone construction is the most magnificent reminder of the attempts by the Russians for gaining an influential position  in the Hawaiian Islands during the early 19th century. Alexander Baranov, governor of the Russian American Company at Sitka, wished to open trade with the Hawaiian Islands to obtain food for the Alaska settlements and sent several vessels for this purpose. One of these ships was wrecked at Waimea, Kauai, in 1815; and the next year Baranov sent Dr. Georg Anton Scheffer for recovering the cargo and, likely, to open a permanent Russian trading post or to gain SL political foothold. Scheffer was successful in quickly gaining influence over King Kaumualii, of Kauai, and in the summer of 1816 persuaded the latter to sign an agreement giving the Russians special trading and economic privileges on Kauai and Oahu. In a failed attempt to build a fort at Honolulu, Scheffer went back to Kauai to consolidate his position with Kaumualii. His aim, evidently, was to convince the king to declare his independence of Kamehameha and enter under Russian protection. He primarily erected an earthwork at Hanalei; and, sometime between April and October, 1817, he built a strong stone fort at Waimea, over which the Russian flag was flown.

The Waimea establishment was a huge one. In addition, the fort was equipped with guns and quarters for troops, Scheffer owned a factory or trading house, with gardens and houses for a staff of about 30 families. Apparently, the fort was not fully completed by the Fall of 1817. By that time Scheffer's peremptory conduct had alienated the Hawaiians. Acting on orders from Kamehameha, the Russians were ousted by Kaumualii.

After the departure of Scheffer from the islands, Hawaiian troops occupied the fort evidently in October 1817. In 1820, a 21-gun salute was fired when the brig Thaddeus came up with the son of Kaumualii, who had been attending school in the United States. The first mission settlement of the Protestants on Kauai took place on the river bank close to the fort. Around 1853, the fort was abandoned because the Hawaiian garrison was withdrawn.

Physical structure 
Varying in cross measurement from 300 to 450 feet, the structure is in the form of ‘an irregular octagon’. The outer walls are made of piled stone; the walls are from 25 to 45 feet thick and about 20 feet high. And those are in good condition until date. The foundations of the magazine, barracks and other buildings are visible inside the walls. The area within and bordering the fort has been extensively cleared for park development as exhibited in the map accompanying this form. The region north and east between the fort and the park boundary have been demolished for the development of the park, an action which probably caused serious damage to any historical ruins and archaeological resources.

See also
Russian colonization of the Americas	
Orthodox Church in Hawaii
Fort Alexander

References

Further reading

External links

 Holy Theotokos of Iveron Russian Orthodox Church of Hawaii
 
 

1817 establishments in Oceania
1864 disestablishments in Oceania
Archaeological sites in Hawaii
Elizabeth
Russian-American Company
State parks of Hawaii
National Historic Landmarks in Hawaii
Hawaiian Kingdom
History of Kauai
Former Russian colonies
Elizabeth
Protected areas of Kauai
European colonisation in Oceania
Elizabeth
1817 establishments in Hawaii
National Register of Historic Places in Kauai County, Hawaii
Star forts